The Achakzai or Achekzai is a Pashtun tribe that resides on both sides of the Durand Line, centered on Killa Abdullah District in Pakistan with some clans as far away as Afghanistan's Kandahar Province.

Identity
The Achakzai is a section of the larger Zirak Durrani tribe. Their name comes from the fact that they trace agnatic (patrilineal) descent from Achak Khan - the paternal grandson of Barak Khan, from whom are descended the Barakzai tribe of Pashtuns; thus, the Achakzai are a branch or sept of the Barakzai, who are themselves a branch of the Zirak Durrani tribe. 

They are divided into two sub-tribes, namely:
 Gujanzai (whose branches are Hameedzai, Khawajazai, Ashezai, Nusratzai, Malezai, Usmanzai)
 Badinzai (whose branches are Yonus, Ghabizai, Kakozai, Shamshozai, Panizai, Piralizai Shabozai, (Badizai)

See also
Pashtun people
Pashtun tribes

References

External links
Encyclopedia Iranica: ACƎKZĪ
tribalanalysiscenter.com (PDF)

Durrani Pashtun tribes